Boykin Mill Complex, also known as Mill Tract Plantation, is a national historic district located near Camden, Kershaw County, South Carolina. The district encompasses nine contributing buildings, two contributing sites, and four contributing structures.  “Boykin Mill” denotes a community which consists of an old post office (ca. 1875), an old general store (c. 1905), a c. 1905 grist mill, mill pond, mill dam, gates, and canals. The community also includes an early 19th-century Greek Revival style Baptist church (c. 1827), one mid-19th-century residence, three 20th-century residences (c. 1935) built for mill workers, and a smoke house. An American Civil War battle site is also a part of the Boykin Mill community. The Battle of Boykin's Mill took place on April 17, 1865.

It was listed on the National Register of Historic Places in 1992.

References

External links
 Boykin's Mill Complex, Boykin, S.C.

Agricultural buildings and structures on the National Register of Historic Places in South Carolina
Historic districts on the National Register of Historic Places in South Carolina
Greek Revival church buildings in South Carolina
Camden, South Carolina
Buildings and structures in Kershaw County, South Carolina
National Register of Historic Places in Kershaw County, South Carolina